Missaglia is a comune (municipality) in the Province of Lecco in the Italian Lombardy region, located at the centre of the area known as the Meratese. As of 31 December 2004, it had a population of 7,805.

 Contra
 Lomaniga
 Maresso
 Missagliola

Missaglia borders the following comuni: 
 Casatenovo
 Lomagna
 Montevecchia 
 Monticello Brianza
 Osnago
 Perego 
 Sirtori
 Viganò

Twin towns
Missaglia is twinned with:

  La Roche-Posay, France

Cities and towns in Lombardy